Imad Gharbawi is a paralympic athlete from Jordan competing mainly in category F52 discus events.

Imad competed in the F52 discus finishing second behind Abdolreza Jokar who broke the world record.

References

External links
 

Paralympic athletes of Jordan
Athletes (track and field) at the 1996 Summer Paralympics
Paralympic silver medalists for Jordan
Living people
Medalists at the 1996 Summer Paralympics
Year of birth missing (living people)
Paralympic medalists in athletics (track and field)
Jordanian discus throwers
Wheelchair discus throwers
Paralympic discus throwers
20th-century Jordanian people